Thedi Vandha Raasa is a 1995 Indian Tamil language film,  directed by Bhoopathi Raja and produced by Nalini Ramarajan. The film stars Ramarajan, Khushbu and Goundamani.

Plot
Anand arrives at Chennai along with a baby claiming that Devi is his wife. She is forced to marry Anand and have his child. However, she is unaware of his intentions and soon learns the truth. Turns out that Devi was responsible for the death of Anand's sister in college in order to avenge her death, Anand decides to teach Devi a lesson by taking his other sister's baby claiming it to be their son.

Cast
Ramarajan as Anand
Khushbu as Devi
Goundamani as Albert Kothandam
Vivek as Vivek
Senthil as Selvam
 Kokila
Janagaraj as Vishwanath
Anandaraj
Kumarimuthu
Thyagu
Seetha
Rajan

Soundtrack
The music was composed by Ilaiyaraaja. The lyrics were written by Pulamaipithan, Kamakodiyan and Ilaiyaraaja.

Reception
R. P. R. of Kalki wrote debutant director Bhupathi Raja, who begins the story in the style of Bhagyaraj, is clear about what to say, not clear about how to say it.

References

External links
 

1995 films
Films scored by Ilaiyaraaja
1990s Tamil-language films